Pipri Buzurg is a village and a Gram Panchayat in Barwani district in the Indian state of Madhya Pradesh.

Geography
It has an average elevation of 225 metres (738 feet). The total area of village is 920.98 hectares.

Demographics
 India census, Rajpur had a population of 17,913. Males constitute 51% of the population and females 49%. Rajpur has an average literacy rate of 59%, lower than the national average of 59.5%: male literacy is 68%, and female literacy is 49%. In Raj.pur, 17% of the population is under 6 years of age.

References

Cities and towns in Barwani district
Barwani